The International School Sport Federation (ISF) is an international sports governing body for school sport. Founded in 1972 with 21 European signatory nations, the federation has been organising international competitions to encourage education through sport and student athletes. It has 132 members, from five continents.

ISF is recognised by the International Olympic Committee since 1995, and is a member of SportAccord. Its headquarters are based in Brussels, Belgium.

ISF limits itself to activities with school children between the ages of 13 to 18 (roughly contiguous with high school age). This distinguishes its role from the longer-established International University Sports Federation, which governs student sport from the ages of 17 to 25. There are currently 45 recognised ISF sports, with many of them having their own World Schools Championship every two years. Other sport disciplines are part of the Gymnasiade, also known as School Summer Games, its winter edition School Winter Games or ISF Combat Games.

The first official ISF championships were in football and volleyball, which both took place in 1972, athletics, basketball, handball and skiing championships followed a year later. The foremost competition held by the ISF is the Gymnasiade – a biennial multi-sport event first held in 1974 in Wiesbaden, Germany that featured athletics, gymnastics and swimming events.

In reaction to the 2022 Russian invasion of Ukraine, the ISF stripped Russia of the right to stage the 2024 ISF Gymnasiade, banned Russia and Belarus from participating in any ISF events, and blocked Russia and Belarus from sending representation to the ISF General Assembly.

History
Around the mid 1960s, international sporting contests between schools has been increasing. Besides occasional and haphazard meetings between two or more schools, tournaments were beginning to be organised regularly in different disciplines: in handball from 1963, in volleyball from 1969, in football one year later, and from 1971 also in basketball. Each of these annual tournaments produced basic regulations and a standing committee.

The large number of international competitions requiring eliminating heats at the national level soon gave rise to a desire to co-ordinate these events, within a specific International Federation. To help promote this idea, the Federal Minister of Education and Arts of the Republic of Austria convened a Conference at Raach in the Autumn of 1971. Here the conditions were discussed for setting up a European School Sport Federation.

After very lengthy debates, the project was approved. However, bearing future development possibilities in mind, the ISF was not limited to European countries alone. A Provisional Committee, the members of which were chosen from among the 21 nations present, was set up, and the meeting of the constituent General Assembly was fixed for 4 June 1972 at Beaufort/Luxembourg. This meeting adopted the Statutes and proceeded to elect the members of the first Executive Committee.

In reaction to the 2022 Russian invasion of Ukraine, the ISF stripped Russia of the right to stage the 2024 ISF Gymnasiade, banned Russia and Belarus from participating in any ISF events, and blocked Russia and Belarus from sending representation to the ISF General Assembly.

Gymnasiade

Gymnasiade is a school sport event for youth athletes aged 15–18. It is held every two (even) years, hosts between 12-18 different sport disciplines and welcomes over 3000 pupils from all over the world.

Regional 

https://archives.collections.ed.ac.uk/repositories/2/archival_objects/87332

First European Schools Games Caen, France  2–8 July 1992.

ISF World Schools Championships

Today 21 sports have a separate World Schools Championship (WSC) with 10-12 championships being held per year. Each World Schools Championship usually last from 3–7 days. Yearly, more than 10.0000 pupils from all over the World take part in ISF World Schools Championship. Until 2017, only 21 Sports have a separate World School Championship (WSC). Other sports exist in Games (Summer , Winter or Combat) and havent separate WSC.

Source :

References

External links
Official website

 
International sports organizations
Sports governing bodies in Belgium
Sport in Antwerp
High school sports
Children's sport
Under-18 sport
Sports organizations established in 1972